William Robinson Miller (1866–1929) was an American architect from Maine. He specialized in richly ornamented Romanesque- and French-Revival buildings.  Born in Durham, Maine, Miller attended Bates College and the School of Architecture at the Massachusetts Institute of Technology (1891–1892).

The firm of William R. Miller was located in Lewiston, Maine, and was in business from 1896 until 1907.  The firm designed schools, libraries, hotels and churches, as well as private residences throughout the state.

In 1907, Miller partnered with Raymond J. Mayo (1879–1966), forming the firm of Miller & Mayo. Shortly after, they moved the practice to Portland, Maine. The practice continued to work on commissions in small towns across Maine.

In 1926, Lester I. Beal (1887–1966) became a partner, and this firm lasted until shortly before Miller's death.

Architectural works

Schools

 School, Winthrop Center, 1900, Demolished*
 Wilson School, Dunn Street, Auburn, 1900, Demolished
 Jordan High School, Lewiston, 1901–02, Extant*
 Beta Theta Pi Fraternity, 19 McKeen Street, Brunswick, 1903, Altered
 Coburn Dormitory, Colby College, Waterville, 1903, Demolished* 
 Manual Training Building (L. C. Bates Museum), Good Will Home, Hinckley, 1903, Extant*
 Morse High School, Bath, 1903, Demolished*
 High School, South Paris, 1903, Demolished
 School, Wilton, 1903, Demolished
 Bancroft-Foote Cottage, Good Will Home, Hinckley, 1904, Altered
 Administration Building, Maine Industrial School for Girls, Hallowell, 1905, Extant
 High School, Lisbon Falls, 1905, Extant
 Charles R. Moody School, Good Will Home, Hinckley, 1905–06, Extant*
 Lawrence High School, Fairfield, 1906–07, Altered*
 Purington Hall, University of Maine Farmington, 1913–14, Extant*
 South (changed to Mallett in 1940) Hall, University of Maine Farmington, 1925, Extant*

Libraries

 Lawrence Library, Fairfield, 1900–01, Extant*
 Cutler Library, Farmington, 1901–02, Extant*
 Carnegie Library, Waterville, 1903–04, Extant
 Carnegie Library, Auburn, 1903–04, Extant

Hotels

 Gerald Hotel, Fairfield, 1899–1900, Altered* 
 Great Northern Hotel, Millinocket, 1900, Demolished* 
 Hotel Rumford, Additions, Rumford Falls, 1901, Demolished
 Hotel, Cape Breton, Nova Scotia, 1903, Unlocated
 Hotel, Bras d'Or Lake, Nova Scotia, 1903, Unlocated 
 Hotel for George Pike, West Stewartstown, New Hampshire, Undated and Unlocated*

Churches
 Wesley Methodist Church, Washington Street, Bath, 1898–99, Extant
 First Congregational Church, Gray, 1900, Extant
 People's Baptist Church, Bath, 1901–02, Demolished*
 Episcopal Church, Millinocket, 1902, Altered*
 Universalist Church, Sabattus Avenue, Lewiston, 1903, Extant*

Residences
 William Greenleaf House, 9 Vine Street, Auburn, 1898, Extant
 Samuel R. Penney House, 38 Maple Street, Mechanic Falls, 1900, Extant
 H. B. Estes Cottage, Pine Point, Old Orchard, c. 1900, Extant
 Almorit R. Penney House, 36 Maple Street, Mechanic Falls, 1900, Demolished
 Charles V. Penney House, Spring Street (Relocated to Pleasant Street), Mechanic Falls, 1900, Altered
 Two Houses for Great Northern Paper Company, Millinocket, c. 1900, Unlocated*
 Snell House Hotel, Houlton, 1901, Demolished
 George W. Bean House, 67 Webster Street, Lewiston, 1903, Altered
 Five Cottages for C. F. Maines, Lewiston, 1903, Unlocated
 J. R. Goodspeed House, Village View Road, Wilton, 1906–07, Extant*
 J. R. Fairchild House, Hoyts Island, Belgrade, c. 1906, Unlocated

Miscellaneous

 Lewiston Daily Journal Building, 12-16 Lisbon Street, Lewiston, 1897, Demolished
 C.M. Rice Block, Market Square, Houlton, 1897, Extant
 The Lewiston, Brunswick and Bath Street Railway Company Carbarn, Lower Lisbon Street, Lewiston, 1899, Demolished
 Knights of Pythias Block, South Paris, 1900, Altered

 Casco Castle and Tower, South Freeport, 1902, Demolished (Tower Extant)*
 St. Mary's Regional Medical Center, Lewiston, 1902, Extant
 McGillicuddy Block, Lisbon Street, Lewiston, 1903, Altered* 
 R. H. Greenleaf Block, Albuquerque, New Mexico, 1903–04, Demolished
 Somerset Railroad Station, Madison, 1904, Extant
 A. H. Shaw Stable, High Street, Bath, 1904, Extant* 
 H. A. Furbish Bank, Rangeley, 1905, Extant
 Fire Station, Skowhegan, 1905, Extant
 General J. A. Hill Tomb, Oak Hill Cemetery, Auburn, 1905, Extant*

The Maine Historical Society maintains a collection of drawings by William R. Miller and successor firms. These consist primarily of working drawings on linen. When drawings exist they are noted with asterisks in the list of commissions. In addition, the Maine Historic Preservation Commission has plans and elevations for the Somerset Railroad Station in Madison.

See also
 List of American Architects
 List of Carnegie libraries in Maine

References

Architects from Maine
1866 births
1929 deaths
Bates College alumni